The Foreign Secretary of Pakistan is the Federal Secretary of the Ministry of Foreign Affairs. The Secretary, as in all other ministries of Government of Pakistan, is the bureaucratic head of the Ministry, who is a BPS-22 grade officer of the Central Superior Services of Pakistan.

The current Foreign Secretary is Sohail Mahmood, who took the  charge of this office in April 2019.

List of Foreign Secretaries

See also
Cabinet Secretary of Pakistan
Establishment Secretary of Pakistan
Aviation Secretary of Pakistan
Commerce Secretary of Pakistan
Foreign relations of Pakistan
Ministry of Foreign Affairs (Pakistan)
Minister of Foreign Affairs (Pakistan)

References

External links 
 Former Foreign Secretaries Government of Pakistan

Foreign Secretaries of Pakistan
Foreign relations of Pakistan
Pakistani diplomats
Ministry of Foreign Affairs (Pakistan)